Congregation B'nai Torah is a Conservative synagogue located in Sandy Springs, Georgia, United States.  It was founded in 1981 by young, unaffiliated Jews who had attended the Hillel High holiday services at Emory University since the 1970s. The 125 member families met in a closed grammar school until 1984, and then for two years in trailers, until they constructed a synagogue building.

The congregation was highly unusual, as it was founded as an Orthodox shul, but without a mechitza.  Because of the challenge of being an independent synagogue, it gradually moved towards the Conservative movement, first identifying as "traditional" ("Conservadox") and then finally affiliating with the Conservative movement in November 2003.

B'nai Torah hired its first Conservative-ordained (and current) rabbi, Joshua Heller, in 2004. At the time, membership was approximately 420 families. As of June 2009, that had grown to 660, and at July 2015, it had reached 750. The synagogue completed a transition to an egalitarian practice, with women now integrated into all ritual roles.

The present location on  700 Mount Vernon Highway contains a large sanctuary, a gift shop, meat and dairy kosher kitchens, a religious school, and a preschool, all of which were renovated in 2014–2015.  The congregation also maintains an eruv around surrounding neighborhoods. B'nai Torah hosts many community organizations and events, including MACoM, the Metro Atlanta Community mikvah was constructed on its campus in 2015.

External links
Congregation B'nai Torah's website

References

Conservadox
Synagogues in Georgia (U.S. state)
Conservative synagogues in the United States
Buildings and structures in Fulton County, Georgia